John Daniels may refer to:

 John W. Daniels (1857–1931), co-founder of Archer Daniels Midland
 John T. Daniels (1873–1948), amateur photographer who took the photograph of the Wright Brothers' first flight
 John Karl Daniels (1875–1978), Norwegian-American sculptor
 John C. Daniels (1936–2015), mayor of New Haven, Connecticut
 John Daniels (cricketer) (born 1942), English cricketer
 John Daniels (actor) (born 1945), African American actor
 John Daniels (footballer) (born 1915), English footballer
 Jon Daniels (born 1977), general manager of the American baseball club the Texas Rangers

See also
John Daniel (disambiguation)
Jack Daniels (disambiguation)
Jonathan Daniels (disambiguation)